Metatron is the third album by experimental rock group Praxis. Rather than featuring numerous guests like earlier albums Metatron is notable for having only the core lineup of bassist and frontman Bill Laswell, guitarist Buckethead and drummer Brain.

Track listing

Personnel 
Praxis:
Buckethead - guitar
Brain - drums
Bill Laswell - bass

References

1994 albums
Praxis (band) albums
Subharmonic (record label) albums